Gómez is a Spanish surname.

Gomez may also refer to:

Places 
Gómez, Buenos Aires, Argentina
Lake Gómez, near the city of Junín, Buenos Aires Province
Gomez, Kentucky, United States, an unincorporated community
Gomez, Texas, United States, a small community in Terry County, Texas
Gómez Municipality, Nueva Esparta, Venezuela
Gómez, Chiriquí, Panama
Gomez Nunatak, a nunatak in Palmer Land, Antarctica

Other uses 
Gomez (band), an English indie rock band
Gómez (given name), a list of people and one fictional character
Gomez, application performance monitoring software. See Compuware
Gōmēz, cattle urine used for ritual purification in Zoroastrianism
Gomez's Hamburger, protoplanetary nebula in the constellation Saggirarius